The England national cricket team toured New Zealand in February and March 1966 and played a three-match Test series against the New Zealand national cricket team. All three matches were drawn.

Test series summary

First Test

Second Test

Third Test

References

External links 
 England tour of New Zealand 1966 at ESPN Cricinfo

1966 in English cricket
1966 in New Zealand cricket
New Zealand cricket seasons from 1945–46 to 1969–70
1965-66
International cricket competitions from 1960–61 to 1970